The 1994 Amway Classic was a tennis tournament played on outdoor hard courts at the ASB Tennis Centre in Auckland, New Zealand that was part of Tier IV of the 1994 WTA Tour. It was the ninth edition of the tournament and was held from 31 January through 6 February, 1994. Third-seeded Ginger Helgeson won the singles title and earned $18,000 first-prize money.

Finals

Singles

 Ginger Helgeson defeated  Inés Gorrochategui 7–6, 6–3
 It was Helgeson's only title of the year and the 1st of her career.

Doubles

 Patricia Hy /  Mercedes Paz defeated  Jenny Byrne /  Julie Richardson 6–4, 7–6
 It was Hy's only title of the year and the 2nd of her career. It was Paz's only title of the year and the 24th of her career.

See also
 1994 Benson and Hedges Open – men's tournament

External links
 ITF tournament edition details
 Tournament draws

Amway Classic
WTA Auckland Open
AM
ASB
ASB
1994 in New Zealand tennis